Ancylolomia fulvitinctalis is a moth in the family Crambidae. It was described by George Hampson in 1919. It is found in Uganda.

References

Endemic fauna of Uganda
Ancylolomia
Moths described in 1919
Moths of Africa